Robert Osborne Abbott ( – ) was an American surgeon and medical director of the Department of Washington during the American Civil War. 

He entered the United States Army in 1849 as assistant surgeon, and in that capacity accompanied Magruder's battery to California. He subsequently served in the East, and also in Florida and Texas. During 1861 he was assistant to the chief medical purveyor in New York. In 1862 he was made medical director of the Fifth Army Corps, and later in the same year was appointed medical director of the Department of Washington, having charge of all the hospitals in and about the capital, together with all the hospital transports. The incessant and arduous duties of this office, which he held until November, 1866, seriously impaired his health. A six months' sick-leave failed to restore it, and he died a victim of over-work. Robert Osborne Abbott died on 16 June 1867 in Brooklyn.

Physicians from Pennsylvania
1824 births
1867 deaths
Union Army surgeons